A station code is a brief, standardised abbreviation, or alphanumeric code, used by railways to identify a railway station uniquely (within a country or region). Codes are mostly used internally but can be seen on railway traffic signs and on some timetables.

Formatting 
In most countries, station codes are purely alphabetic, usually compromising three capital letters for ease of identification. For example, Whampoa station of the MTR has the code of WHA. Indian Railways uses one- to four-letter codes. Most stations of the Indian Railways are assigned three letter codes, for example, the station code for Mumbai Central station is BCT.

One-letter station codes of the Indian Railways

 G: Gondia Junction railway station
 J: Jalna railway station
 M: Mahendragarh railway station
 R: Raipur Junction railway station
 S: Shrirangapattana railway station
 V: Vashi railway station
 Y: Yeliyur railway station
 Unallocated one-letter station codes of the Indian Railways include A, B, C, D, E, F, I, H, K, L, N, P, Q, T, U, W, X and Z.

In England, Scotland and Wales of the UK, railway stations are assigned three-letter codes and are issued by National Rail and are called the Computer Reservation System (CRS), this is not the case in Northern Ireland. In Scandinavia, railway stations are assigned a capital letter followed by a sequence of lowercase letters that represent the station's name. For example, Stockholm commuter rail's Stockholm City Station has the station code Sci. Deutsche Bahn in Germany uses an alphabetic station code system called the DS 100 code, for example, Luckenwalde station in Brandenburg has the station code BLD. In South Korea, station codes are purely numeric, to reduce the problem of language and writing system barriers. For example, Seoul Metropolitan Subway's Singeumho station has the code of 538.

Lists 
Standards for station codes in different countries include:
 List of Amtrak station codes, United States and Canada
 List of Deutsche Bahn station abbreviations, Germany
 List of MTR station codes, Hong Kong, China
 UK railway stations. Three-letter alpha codes (formerly called CRS codes - Computer Reservation System) are issued by National Rail which is responsible for railways in Great Britain. Station codes are not used by Northern Ireland Railways for stations in Northern Ireland.
 List of railway stations in India

See also
 Station numbering

References

Railway stations